Robert Earl Allen (July 2, 1914 – October 30, 2005) was a Major League Baseball pitcher. Allen played for the Philadelphia Phillies in 1937. He batted and threw right-handed.

Pitching in a total of 3 games, Allen's only decision came on October 2, 1937, when he started the game and pitched  innings, surrendered 7 runs (4 earned), as the Phillies were defeated, 1–7, to the Boston Bees at Braves Field.

Allen was born in Smithville, Tennessee, and died in Chesapeake, Virginia.

References

External links

1914 births
2005 deaths
Philadelphia Phillies players
Baseball players from Tennessee
People from Smithville, Tennessee
Major League Baseball pitchers
Jackson Mississippians players
Tallahassee Capitals players
Portsmouth Cubs players
Montgomery Rebels players
Pensacola Pilots players
Gadsden Pilots players
Tarboro Serpents players